Upemba National Park is a large national park in Haut-Lomami, Lualaba Province & Haut-Katanga Province (formerly in Katanga Province) of the southeastern Democratic Republic of Congo, formerly Zaire.

Geography
It was the largest park in Africa.

Its lower section is located in the Upemba Depression, a lush area of lakes and marshes including the eponymous Lake Upemba, and bordered by the Lualaba River. Its higher section is in the dryer Kibara Plateau mountains.

History
Upemba National Park was first established in 1939. As with much of the wildlife of the region, in contemporary times the park continues to be threatened by the activities of poachers, pollution, and the activities of refugees and militia.

There are also a handful of villages in the park. In recent years, the park has come under considerable attack from poachers and local militias. On 28 May 2004, for instance, the park headquarters in Lusinga came under attack by the Mai Mai militia. Several wardens and their families were killed, the headquarters were burned down, and the family of the chief warden was taken hostage.

On 1 June 2005, the protectors of the park received the Abraham Conservation Award for their role in protecting the rich biodiversity of the Congo River basin.

Habitat
The habitat of the park varies from Afromontane grasslands and forests at higher altitudes in the Kibara Mountains; through Miombo woodlands and tropical rainforests; to marshes, wetlands, lakes, and streams with riparian zones at the lower altitudes. It is home to some 1,800 different species, some of them discovered as late as 2003.

Lake Upemba has a maximum depth reported to be only  and it is a site of intense algae growth. The watercourses of the region fluctuate according to the season and the water level in the lakes is high from March to June, and low from October to January. Many of the bodies of the water in the area are characterized by extensive swamps, with papyrus, Nile lettuce and water caltrop among other species.

Fauna
The system of lakes, rivers, swamps and wetlands supports a variety of fish fauna. This includes over 30 species of Cyprinidae, Mormyridae (also known as freshwater elephant fish), Barbus, Alestidae, Mochokidae and Cichlidae.

Bird species include several threatened or endangered species, such as the shoebill, wattled crane and spotted ground-thrush.

Schmidt's snouted frog is only known from the park.

See also
Congo Rainforest
National parks of the Democratic Republic of the Congo
List of national parks in Africa

References

 
Central Zambezian miombo woodlands
Haut-Lomami
Lualaba Province
Haut-Katanga Province
Miombo
Protected areas established in 1939
1939 establishments in the Belgian Congo